Hinckley House may refer to:

Ward Hinckley House, Blue Hill, Maine
Hinckley Homestead, Barnstable, Massachusetts
Capt. Joseph Hinckley House, Barnstable, Massachusetts
Nymphus Hinckley House, Barnstable, Massachusetts
S. Alexander Hinckley House, Barnstable, Massachusetts
Col. J. Hinckley House, Fenton, Michigan, listed on the National Register of Historic Places (NRHP)